Selina Özuzun Doğan (born Selina Özuzun in 1977), aka Selina Doğan, is a Turkish politician of Armenian ethnicity who served as a member of the Turkish Parliament between 2015 and 2018. She became one of the first Armenian members of Turkey’s parliament in decades, alongside Markar Esayan (AKP) and Garo Paylan (HDP).

Family life
She was born in 1977 in Istanbul. After completing her secondary education at the French high school Lycée Notre Dame de Sion Istanbul, she received a degree in law at Galatasaray University, and then took a master's degree from Istanbul Bilgi University. Furthermore, she began her professional career working in a law firm and serving as a lawyer for the minority foundations.

She is married and has two children.

Politician career
Selina Özuzun Doğan was nominated as a candidate for the June 2015 general election by the Republican People's Party (CHP). Upon agreeing with the proposal of minority groups to have a representative in the parliament, Kemal Kılıçdaroğlu, leader of CHP, put her name on the first place of the party's candidate list for Istanbul 2nd Constituency.

On June 7, 2015, she was elected into the parliament, and became so the first Armenian members of the Grand National Assembly in decades alongside Garo Paylan (HDP) and Markar Esayan (AKP). Apart from Hermine Kalustyan, who served six months in the Constituent Assembly of Turkey after her appointment by the military junta following the 1960 Turkish coup d'état, Özuzun Doğan is the only female Armenian member of the parliament in the history of Turkish politics.

She was not re-nominated as a CHP candidate for the 2018 Elections.

References

1977 births
Politicians from Istanbul
Galatasaray University alumni
Istanbul Bilgi University alumni
Contemporary Republican People's Party (Turkey) politicians
Deputies of Istanbul
Members of the 25th Parliament of Turkey
Living people
Lycée Notre Dame de Sion Istanbul alumni
Members of the 26th Parliament of Turkey
Ethnic Armenian politicians
21st-century Turkish women politicians
Turkish women lawyers
21st-century Turkish lawyers
Turkish people of Armenian descent
21st-century women lawyers